Alec Jackson (born 29 May 1937) is an English former footballer who played as a winger or inside forward. During his professional career he represented West Bromwich Albion, Birmingham City and Walsall.

Biography 
Jackson was born in Tipton, Staffordshire. He joined West Bromwich Albion as an amateur in May 1954 and turned professional in September of the same year. He became the youngest player to score a league goal for the club when he scored on his debut against Charlton Athletic in November 1954. He spent another decade at Albion, a First Division club; they had just won the FA Cup when he made his debut, but won no more trophies during Jackson's time with the club.

He scored 52 goals in 208 appearances for Albion before moving to Birmingham City in 1964. He was in the Birmingham team that suffered relegation from the First Division in 1965 and stayed at the club for two more seasons. In 1967, he signed for Walsall where he spent one season.

He later dropped down into non-league football, playing for Nuneaton Borough, Kidderminster Harriers, Warley, Oldbury Town, Warley County Borough, Darlaston, Blakenall, Lower Gornal, Rushall Olympic and Bush Rangers.

After his professional football career was over, Jackson went on to work on the track, making cars at the Austin works in Longbridge, Birmingham.

References 

1937 births
English footballers
West Bromwich Albion F.C. players
Birmingham City F.C. players
Walsall F.C. players
Nuneaton Borough F.C. players
Kidderminster Harriers F.C. players
Oldbury Town F.C. players
Warley County Borough F.C. players
Darlaston Town F.C. players
Blakenall F.C. players
Gornal Athletic F.C. players
Rushall Olympic F.C. players
Association football wingers
Living people
Sportspeople from Tipton
English Football League players
English Football League representative players
Association football inside forwards